Rajya Sabha elections were held in 2004, to elect members of the Rajya Sabha, Indian Parliament's upper chamber. The elections were held to elect respectively 13 members from six states, 49 members from 12 states, six members from Andhra Pradesh, and two members from Haryana, for the Council of States, the Rajya Sabha.

Elections
Elections were held in 2004 to elect members from various states.
The list is incomplete.

Members elected
The following members are elected in the elections held in 2004. They are members for the term 2004–2010 and retire in year 2010, except in case of the resignation or death before the term.

State – Member – Party

Bye-elections
The following bye elections were held in the year 2004.

State – Member – Party

 Bye-elections were held on 21/06/2004 for vacancy from Andhra and Punjab due to death of seating members K. M. Khan on 16/10/2003 with term ending on 02/04/2006 and Gurcharan Singh  on 01/04/2004, with term ending on 09/04/2008.

 Bye-elections were held on 21/06/2004 for vacancy from Rajasthan due to death of seating member Dr Abrar Ahmed on 04/05/2004 with term ending on 09/04/2008.

 Bye-elections were held on 28/06/2004 for vacancy from Bihar due to election to Lok Sabha of seating members Rajiv Ranjan Singh on 13/05/2004 with term ending on 02/04/2006 and Lalu Prasad on 13/05/2004 with term ending on 09/04/2008.

 Bye-elections were held on 28/06/2004 for vacancy from Madhya pradesh and West Bengal due to election to Lok Sabha of seating members Kailash Chandra on 13/05/2004 with term ending on 02/04/2006 and Pranab Mukherjee on 13/05/2004 with term ending on 18/08/2005.

 Bye-elections were held on 28/06/2004 for vacancy from Orissa due to election to Lok Sabha of seating members Manamohan Samal on 13/05/2004 with term ending on 03/04/2006.

 Bye-elections were held on 28/06/2004 for vacancy from Delhi due to resignation of seating members Ambika Soni on 10 June 2004 with term ending on 27 January 2006 and Dr A R Kidwai on 7 July 2004  with term ending on 27 January 2006.

 Bye-elections were held on 06/01/2005 for vacancy from Kerala due to death of seating members V. V. Raghavan on 27/10/2004 with term ending on 01/07/2006.

References

2004 elections in India
2004